Vampire (originally named The Vampire) is an Arrow suspended swinging roller coaster at Chessington World of Adventures theme park in London, England. It opened in 1990 in the new Transylvania area (now renamed "Wild Woods") and is the only Arrow Dynamics suspended roller coaster still operating outside of North America. 

The trains hang from the track, and swing freely as the roller coaster completes the course. It has two lift hills, featuring many dives and turns throughout, and takes place almost entirely through a forest. The ride layout was designed by John Wardley and the theme design by British firm Sparks Creative Services.

The Vampire underwent modifications in 2001 so that it could use new trains manufactured by Vekoma and reopened in 2002.

History

Theme
The ride has a Gothic theme and was originally very detailed, with a queueline through castle gates, a fog-filled underpass beneath the coaster track, a graveyard canopy with Gothic tombs and dark passageway into the station. The station was dressed as a castle ballroom with flaming chandeliers, Gothic murals and a large pipe organ stage piece, with dramatic lighting and audio. However most of this has since been removed. The famous theme music in the station was composed by Graham Smart in the style of an organ overture with a Gothic rock sound, alluding to Phantom of the Opera.

The station features an animatronic organist playing at a large pipe organ. The character originally moved in time to the soundtrack, appearing to play to the music. In 2015, the graveyard canopy was demolished following years of little maintenance. The grand station chandeliers were also removed. Now, very little of the themed queue and station exists the way it was intended, with much of the scenery, sound and lighting design lost.

The rollercoaster originally had black, bat-themed trains. Towards the end of the ride, the coaster takes a sudden drop into a tunnel, before entering into the brake run. The tunnel was originally longer, darker and themed as a cave, but this has been removed.

In 1998, the ride was partly refurbished with new branding.

Floorless refurbishment
As Vampire started to show its age, it suffered from a number of breakdowns and maintenance problems. The manufacturer, Arrow Dynamics, had gone bankrupt since the ride had been built, meaning little could be done to rectify these issues. The Vampire was closed for the 2001 season, and at the time this was thought to be permanent.

However, instead of removal, the decision was taken to modify the ride so that it could use a new type of suspended coaster train. The track was to remain unchanged because modifying this would require planning permission, which was unlikely to be granted. Since the ride consisted of the suspended swinging model, with tight corners, any new trains would also have to be able to swing (reducing lateral Gs). This led to the development of swinging suspended floorless coaster trains, manufactured by Vekoma, which are still in use today. The modified ride opened in 2002.

Gallery

See also

Chessington World of Adventures Resort

References

External links
Vampire at Chessington World Of Adventures
Vampire at ThemeParks-UK

1990 establishments in England
Roller coasters in the United Kingdom
Roller coasters operated by Merlin Entertainments
Roller coasters introduced in 1990
Animatronic attractions
Chessington World of Adventures rides
Rides designed by John Wardley